The Syracuse Utah Temple is a temple of the Church of Jesus Christ of Latter-day Saints under construction in Syracuse, Utah. Plans to construct the temple were announced in April 2020 by church president Russell M. Nelson, during the church's general conference. The temple will be the third in Davis County and the 22nd in the state of Utah.

Plans announced in 2021 state the temple will be a three-story building of approximately 89,000 square feet. The groundbreaking for the temple occurred on June 12, 2021.

See also

 The Church of Jesus Christ of Latter-day Saints in Utah
 Comparison of temples of The Church of Jesus Christ of Latter-day Saints
 List of temples of The Church of Jesus Christ of Latter-day Saints
 List of temples of The Church of Jesus Christ of Latter-day Saints by geographic region
 Temple architecture (Latter-day Saints)

References 

Temples (LDS Church) in Utah